The 2021–22 Queens Park Rangers Football Club season is the club's 140th season in existence and the club's 7th consecutive season in the second division of English football. In addition to the domestic league, Queens Park Rangers participated in this season's editions of the FA Cup, and the EFL Cup.

Players

First team squad

Kit
Supplier: Erreà / Sponsor: Ashville Holdings

Kit information
QPR agreed a multi-year partnership with Erreà as the official technical kit suppliers, the 2021–22 season will be the fifth year of the deal. The kits will be 100 percent bespoke designs for the duration of the deal.

On 16 July 2021 QPR announced Ashville Holdings as the main shirt sponsor for the 2021–22 season on a one-year deal.

Transfers

Transfers in

Loans in

Transfers out

Loans out

Pre-season and friendlies
Queens Park Rangers revealed they would play friendly matches against Gillingham, Manchester United, Cambridge United and Leicester City as part of their pre-season preparations. Later it's revealed that Queens Park Rangers played Portsmouth in a behind-closed-doors pre-season on 7 July 2021

However, the friendly against Gillingham planned for 27 July, was later cancelled due to a number of positive COVID-19 test results within the Gills squad.

Competitions

EFL Championship

League table

Results summary

Results by matchday

Matches
QPR's fixtures were released on 24 June 2021.

FA Cup

QPR were drawn at home to Rotherham United in the third round.

EFL Cup

QPR were drawn away to Leyton Orient in the first round,. Then at home to Oxford United, Everton and Sunderland in the second, third and fourth round respectively.

Squad statistics

Statistics

|-

|-
! colspan="14" style="background:#dcdcdc; text-align:center"| Out on Loan

|}

Goals

Clean sheets

Disciplinary record

References

External links

Queens Park Rangers F.C. seasons
Queens Park Rangers
Queens Park Rangers
Queens Park Rangers